This is an alphabetical list of Jewish feminists.

Jewish feminists
This is an incomplete list, which may never be able to satisfy certain standards for completeness. Revisions and additions are welcome.

See also 
Jewish feminism
Judaism and women
Jewish left
List of feminists
Jewish mother stereotype
Jewish-American princess
Jewish Orthodox Feminist Alliance
Lilith (magazine)
National Council of Jewish Women
Partnership minyan
Role of women in Judaism
Shira Hadasha

References

Jewish
Feminists